E. Elizabeth Johnson is an American New Testament scholar and the J. Davison Philips Professor of New Testament at Columbia Theological Seminary. She is widely known for her writings on the New Testament, specifically the Pauline Letters.

Career
Johnson received a B.G.S. from Ohio University, an M.Div. and a Ph.D. from Princeton Theological Seminary. She was the chaplain and instructor in Humanities at Queens College (1979-1983) before she became a Teaching Fellow at Princeton Theological Seminary (1983-1986). Beginning in 1986, she served as the associate professor of New Testament at New Brunswick Theological Seminary (1986-1998). She is currently the J. Davison Philips Professor of New Testament, Emerita at Columbia Theological Seminary.

Thought
Johnson has contributed extensively to a number of commentary series and scholarly publications. Her work includes being an editor of the Feasting on the Word: Preaching the Revised Common Lectionary series and co-general editor to the Feasting on the Gospels series, which includes Feasting on the Gospels: Matthew Vols. 1 and 2, that were awarded the Reference Book of the Year award from the Academy of Parish Clergy.

Johnson has been interested in the ways the church uses the Bible to think about faith and life. Her work explores how the Pauline letters invite us to reflect about who God is and what Jesus' death and resurrection mean for human life and society. Her work has also explored how the New Testament relates to families and family values. Her exegetical perspective has allowed for new ways of viewing and interpreting many of the epistles of the New Testament to address today's world. Through her work she has contributed to Feminist-Womanist Biblical Studies and has contributed to the national conversation on capital punishment by giving a lecture titled, The Bible and Capital Punishment, during a Teach-in at Columbia Theological Seminary.

Works

Thesis

Books
 
  - publication of author's thesis

as Editor

Chapters

Articles

References

External links
Full list of publications
Feasting on the Word Series

Living people
American biblical scholars
Christian scholars
Presbyterian Church (USA)
Columbia Theological Seminary faculty
Princeton Theological Seminary alumni
Ohio University alumni
New Testament scholars
Year of birth missing (living people)
Female biblical scholars